La Aventura de los paraguas asesinos ( Adventure of the Umbrella Murderers) is a 1979 Argentine comedy film directed by Carlos Galettini.

Cast
 Ricardo Bauleo as Tiburón
 Víctor Bó as Delfín
 Julio De Grazia as Mojarrita
 Graciela Alfano as Agente Serena
 Gianni Lunadei

External links
 

Argentine comedy films
1970s Spanish-language films
Films directed by Carlos Galettini
1979 films
1970s Argentine films